Scientific Study of Literature is a biannual peer-reviewed academic journal published by John Benjamins Publishing Company since 2011. It covers research in literary study. The editor-in-chief is David Ian Hanauer (Indiana University of Pennsylvania), founding editor and editor-in-chief from 2011-2013 was Willie van Peer (Ludwig Maximilian University of Munich). It is the official journal of the International Society for the Empirical Study of Literature, with membership including a subscription. The concept of the journal is discussed, because of its programmatic title, which suggests to bridge the common antagonism between sciences and literary study.

Abstracting and indexing 
The journal is abstracted and indexed in International Bibliography of Periodical Literature, European Reference Index for the Humanities ERIH PLUS, Linguistics and Language Behaviour Abstracts, and MLA Bibliography.

See also 
• Poetics Today

References

External links 
 

Literary theory
Biannual journals
John Benjamins academic journals
Publications established in 2011
English-language journals
Literary magazines published in the United States